Ali Merdan (1904–1981) was an Iraqi musician of Kurdish descent who was born in Kirkuk, widely regarded as the man who revolutionized the maqam. He launched the Kurdish Radio Station in 1939 in Baghdad.

Childhood

At the age of six, Ali's father died therefore many responsibilities fell on his shoulder like supporting his family and at the same time to finish his studies.

Career
During his half a century career, according to relatives and close friends, he sang more than 1000 songs, but not all of them have been recorded due to a lack of recording equipment in his early days. Ali merdan was the inspirational artist and inspired the golden generation of Kurdish Singers such as Muhamad Salih Dilan, Mamle, Hesen Zirek, Tahir Tofiq and Ahmad Shamal

Death
On July 24, 1981, Ali Merdan died at the age of 77.

See also
Music of Iraq
Kurdish music

References
 Xozga - Ali Merdan
 World Music - Ali Merdan
 The Voice of a Genius

Iraqi Kurdish people
Kurdish-language singers
1904 births
1981 deaths
People from Kirkuk
20th-century Iraqi male singers